Amorphinopsis is a genus of sea sponges belonging to the family Halichondriidae.

Species 

 Amorphinopsis armata (Lindgren, 1897)
 Amorphinopsis atlantica Carvalho, Hajdu, Mothes & van Soest, 2004
 Amorphinopsis dichotoma (Dendy, 1916)
 Amorphinopsis excavans Carter, 1887
 Amorphinopsis fenestrata (Ridley, 1884)
 Amorphinopsis filigrana (Schmidt, 1862)
 Amorphinopsis fistulosa (Vacelet, Vasseur & Lévi, 1976)
 Amorphinopsis foetida (Dendy, 1889)
 Amorphinopsis kempi Kumar, 1925
 Amorphinopsis maculosa (Pulitzer-Finali, 1996)
 Amorphinopsis maza (Laubenfels, 1954)
 Amorphinopsis megarrhaphea (Lendenfeld, 1887)
 Amorphinopsis mollis Annandale, 1924
 Amorphinopsis pallescens (Topsent, 1892)
 Amorphinopsis papillata (Baer, 1906)
 Amorphinopsis sacciformis (Thiele, 1900)
 Amorphinopsis siamensis (Topsent, 1925)
 Amorphinopsis subacerata (Ridley & Dendy, 1886)
 Amorphinopsis heterostyla (Hentschel, 1912)
 Amorphinopsis megalorrhaphis (Carter, 1881) 
 Amorphinopsis mertoni (Hentschel, 1912)
 Amorphinopsis oculata (Kieschnick, 1896)
 Amorphinopsis reptans (Kirkpatrick, 1903)
 Amorphinopsis spongia (de Laubenfels, 1953)

References 

Halichondrida
Taxa named by Henry John Carter